KEUL is a non-commercial Community radio station in Girdwood, Alaska, broadcasting on 88.9 FM.  The station originally began as a non-licensed station, during a proliferation of such in the Anchorage area during the 1990s.  Pressure from the Girdwood community in the wake of its impending shutdown, particularly from community leaders who recognized the need for a means to relay emergency information, led to its reinvention as a licensed station.

See also
List of community radio stations in the United States

External links
KEUL's Website

EUL
Community radio stations in the United States
Radio stations established in 1972